Paradise Island Resort is a five star resort situated on Lankanfinolhu island in the Malé Atoll (Kaafu Atoll) administrative division in the Republic of Maldives. 

The resort is owned by the Villa Group.

References

Resorts in the Maldives
Hotel buildings completed in 1994
Hotels established in 1994
1994 establishments in the Maldives